An extinct radionuclide is a radionuclide that was formed by nucleosynthesis before the formation of the Solar System, about 4.6 billion years ago, but has since decayed to virtually zero abundance and is no longer detectable as a primordial nuclide. Extinct radionuclides were generated by various processes in the early Solar system, and became part of the composition of meteorites and protoplanets. All widely documented extinct radionuclides have half-lives shorter than 100 million years.

Short-lived radioisotopes that are found in nature are continuously generated or replenished by natural processes, such as cosmic rays (cosmogenic nuclides), background radiation, or the decay chain or spontaneous fission of other radionuclides.

Short-lived isotopes that are not generated or replenished by natural processes are not found in nature, so they are known as extinct radionuclides. Their former existence is inferred from a superabundance of their stable or nearly stable decay products.

Examples of extinct radionuclides include iodine-129 (the first to be noted in 1960, inferred from excess xenon-129 concentrations in meteorites, in the xenon-iodine dating system), aluminium-26 (inferred from extra magnesium-26 found in meteorites), and iron-60.

The Solar System and Earth formed from primordial nuclides and extinct nuclides. Extinct nuclides have decayed away, but primordial nuclides still exist in their original state (undecayed). There are 251 stable primordial nuclides, and remainders of 35 primordial radionuclides that have very long half-lives.

List of extinct radionuclides
A partial list of radionuclides not found on Earth, but for which decay products are present:

Plutonium-244 and samarium-146 have half-lives long enough to still be present on Earth, but they have not been confirmed experimentally to be present.

Notable isotopes with shorter lives still being produced on Earth include:
Manganese-53 and beryllium-10 are produced by cosmic ray spallation on dust in the upper atmosphere.
Uranium-236 is produced in uranium ores by neutrons from other radioisotopes.
Iodine-129 is produced from tellurium-130 by cosmic-ray muons and from cosmic ray spallation of stable xenon isotopes in the atmosphere.

Radioisotopes with half-lives shorter than one million years are also produced: for example, carbon-14 by cosmic ray production in the atmosphere (half-life 5730 years).

Use in geochronology
Despite the fact that the radioactive isotopes mentioned above are now effectively extinct, the record of their existence is found in their decay products and are very useful to geologists who wish to use them as geochronometers. Their usefulness derives from a few factors such as the fact that their short half-lives provide high chronological resolution and the chemical mobility of various elements can date unique geological processes such as igneous fractionation and surface weathering. There are, however, hurdles to overcome when using extinct nuclides. The need for high-precision isotope ratio measurements is paramount as the extinct radionuclides contribute such a small fraction of the daughter isotopes. Compounding this problem is the increasing contribution that high-energy cosmic rays have on already minute amounts of daughter isotopes formed from the extinct nuclides. Distinguishing the source and abundance of these effects is critical to obtaining accurate ages from extinct nuclides. Additionally, more work needs to be done in determining a more precise half-life for some of these isotopes, such as 60Fe and 146Sm.

See also
Presolar grains
Radiogenic nuclide, the dual concept
Radiometric dating
List of nuclides which includes a list of radionuclides in order by half-life

References

External links
List of isotopes found and not found in nature, with half-lives
Discussion of extinct radionuclides

Geochemistry
Geochronology
Radioactivity